Pallavi Patel is an Indian politician. She is the leader of Apna Dal (Kamerawadi) party. She is daughter of Apna Dal Founder Dr. Sone Lal Patel and current Member of the Uttar Pradesh Legislative Assembly from Sirathu as Samajwadi Party candidate.

Political career
In the 2022 Uttar Pradesh Legislative Assembly election, Apna Dal (Kamerawadi)'s leader, Dr. Pallavi Patel, defeated Deputy Chief Minister Keshav Prasad Maurya, by margin of 7,337 votes in Sirathu.

References

Uttar Pradesh MLAs 2022–2027
Samajwadi Party politicians from Uttar Pradesh
Living people
Women members of the Uttar Pradesh Legislative Assembly
Apna Dal politicians